Jonatas may refer to:

Jônatas (footballer, born 1982), full name Jônatas Domingos, Brazilian football midfielder
Jonatas (footballer, born 1983), full name Jonatas Oliveira Cardoso, Brazilian football striker
Jônatas Obina (born 1985), Equatoguinean football forward
Jonatas Faro (born 1987), Brazilian actor
Jonatas Belusso (born 1988), Brazilian football striker

See also
Jonata (born 1997), full name Jonata de Oliveira Bastos, Brazilian football forward
Jonathan (disambiguation)
Jonatan